North Lake is a suburb located  south of the central business district of Perth, the capital of Western Australia, and  from the Indian Ocean. Named after the eponymous lake, the suburb and lake are located within the City of Cockburn local government area.

Geography
The suburb is named after the lake of the same name within the locality. It is part of the northernmost lake within a chain of lakes which make up the Beeliar Regional Park (North Lake, Bibra Lake, South Lake, Booragoon Lake, Yangebup Lake, and Thomsons Lake). The lake has been known by this name since 1877, and the name was approved for the suburb in 1954.

The suburb is located on the northern edge of the City of Cockburn.  It is bounded by Farrington Road to the north, the Kwinana Freeway to the east, the Roe Highway road reservation to the south and North Lake Road to the west.

Education
There are no schools within the suburb, with many North Lake residents using the state government primary schools in Coolbellup and Kardinya. Directly to the north of the suburb lies Murdoch University and Kennedy Baptist College.

Recreation
The Lakeside Recreation Centre is located in North Lake on the corner of Farrington Road and Bibra Drive. It is home to four basketball courts, a Baptist church, a gym, and a creche. Lakeside Recreation Centre is the home court of the State Basketball League team, the Lakeside Lightning.

Apart from North Lake and the surrounding Beeliar Regional Park, the suburb contains the Perth Spanish Club, a golf driving range, Adventure World, Cockburn Ice Skating arena, and an adventure playground next to the lake at Progress Drive.

References

External links

Suburbs of Perth, Western Australia
Suburbs in the City of Cockburn